Rhodoxanthin is a xanthophyll pigment with a purple color that is found in small quantities in a variety of plants including Taxus baccata and Lonicera morrowii.  It is also found in the feathers of some birds.  As a food additive it is used under the E number E161f as a food coloring. It is not approved for use in the EU or US; however, it is approved in Australia and New Zealand (where it is listed under its INS number 161f).

References

Carotenoids
Food colorings
Tetraterpenes
Diketones
Cyclohexenes